Louis-Philippe Normand,  (September 21, 1863 – June 27, 1928) was a Canadian physician and politician.

Born in Trois-Rivières, Quebec, the son of Télesphore-Eusèbe Normand and Alphonsine Giroux, he received his Doctor of Medicine from Université Laval in 1886. A practicing physician, he was also mayor of Trois-Rivières. In 1911, he ran for the House of Commons of Canada in the Quebec riding of Three Rivers and St. Maurice as the Conservative candidate and was defeated. In September 1921, he was appointed President of the Privy Council in the cabinet of Arthur Meighen. He was defeated in the 1921 federal election which was held in December.

In 1922, Normand was appointed as President of the Medical Council of Canada.

He married Graziella Beaulieu and had nine children.

In 1916, a geographic township in the Mékinac Regional County Municipality was named after him, which in turn gave its name to a lake and the Lac-Normand unorganized territory.

References

External links
 

1863 births
1928 deaths
Conservative Party of Canada (1867–1942) candidates for the Canadian House of Commons
Members of the King's Privy Council for Canada
Mayors of Trois-Rivières
Université Laval alumni